Bisacurone is a chemical compound with the molecular formula C15H24O3 which has been isolated from turmeric (Curcuma longa). In vitro, it has several effects including anti-inflammatory, anti-oxidant, and anti-metastatic properties.

References

Sesquiterpenes
Cyclohexenes